No Place Like Home is the fifth studio album by Scottish band Big Country, released in 1991. (see 1991 in music). Its title derives from a quote in The Wonderful Wizard of Oz, which is referenced by the first track, "We're Not in Kansas". Dorothy's statement was in turn taken from the famous poem and song Home! Sweet Home! by John Howard Payne and Henry Bishop.

Critical reception

Upon its release, Simon Dudfield of NME noted the band's transition from their "straight rock" and "old Scottish growl" to "a more traditional R&B feel". He concluded, "By returning to a form of music they truly love, Big Country have made a commendable step in the right direction; a bright start to their decade." Caren Myers was critical of the album and concluded there is "no place like the bin". She described Big Country as a band that "makes Lime Spiders look like The Rolling Stones" and Adamson as a "Celtic Springsteen wannabe". She felt the album was made up of a "series of insufferable bar-room boogies" and added, "This, we are told, is Big Country getting back to basics, their R&B roots. Naturally, all sentient listeners will wish they wouldn't, but who listens to us anyway?"

Track listing

"You, Me and the Truth" and "Comes a Time" were bonus tracks on the CD and cassette releases of the album; they were not on the original vinyl release. The 2014 deluxe edition of the album restores the vinyl running order and moves these tracks to a bonus disc.

Personnel
Big Country
Stuart Adamson - guitar, vocals
Tony Butler - bass, vocals
Bruce Watson - guitar, mandolin

Additional musicians'
Pat Ahern - drums on "Freedom Song" 
Mark Brzezicki - drums, percussion
Richie Close - piano, programming
Katie Kissoon - additional vocals
Carol Kenyon - additional vocals

Charts

References

Big Country albums
1991 albums
Vertigo Records albums
Albums produced by Pat Moran
Albums recorded at Rockfield Studios